Time Locks and Diamonds is a 1917 American silent crime film directed by Walter Edwards and starring William Desmond, Gloria Hope and Robert McKim.

Cast
 William Desmond as Silver Jim Farrel
 Gloria Hope as Marjory Farrel
 Robert McKim as Crabbe
 Rowland V. Lee as Edgar Seymour 
 Mildred Harris as Lolita Mendoza
 George Beranger as Ramon Mendoza
 Tom Guise as Howe Seymour 
 Milton Ross as Blaisdell
 Laura Sears as Maid
 Kate Bruce as Housekeeper
 Margaret Thompson as Rose

References

Bibliography
 Katchmer, George A. A Biographical Dictionary of Silent Film Western Actors and Actresses. McFarland, 2015.

External links
 

1917 films
1917 crime films
American silent feature films
American crime films
American black-and-white films
Triangle Film Corporation films
Films directed by Walter Edwards
1910s English-language films
1910s American films